Adam Rogers may refer to:

 Adam Rogers (musician) (born 1965), American jazz guitarist
 Adam Rogers (Canadian football) (born 1985), Canadian football offensive lineman